Kosova24 (English: Kosovo24) is an independent news media based in Kosovo. The news portal is designated for reporting events currently happening in the nation of Kosovo. The online daily news web portal Kosova24 is a medium of free sponsors. Kosova24 changed its name from (Previous: Kosova 24) to Kosova24 on 13, May 2020

See also
List of newspapers in Kosovo

References

External links 
 
 

Kosovan news websites
News agencies based in Kosovo
News media in Kosovo
Newspapers published in Kosovo